The Real Me is an album of mostly standards by American singer Patti Austin released in 1988, and recorded for the Qwest label. The album reached #7 on Billboards Jazz chart.

Track listing
"I Can Cook Too" (Leonard Bernstein, Betty Comden, Adolph Green) - 5:14
"Stockholm Sweetnin'" (Quincy Jones) - 1:37
"Smoke Gets in Your Eyes" (Jerome Kern, Otto Harbach) - 4:15
"True Love" (Cole Porter) - 3:49
"Across the Alley From the Alamo" (Joe Greene) - 3:47
"How Long Has This Been Going On?" (George Gershwin, Ira Gershwin) - 4:07
"Lazy Afternoon" (Jerome Moross, John La Touche) - 5:46
"Love Letters" (Victor Young, Edward Heyman) - 3:55
"They Can't Take That Away From Me" (George Gershwin, Ira Gershwin) - 3:59
"Mood Indigo" (Duke Ellington, Barney Bigard, Irving Mills) - 3:26
"Cry Me a River" (Arthur Hamilton) - 4:21
"Someone Is Standing Outside" (Jimmy Webb) - 3:54
"Spring Can Really Hang You Up The Most" (Tommy Wolf, Fran Landesman) - 5:08

 Personnel 
 Patti Austin – lead vocals, backing vocals (1, 3, 7, 10, 12), vocal arrangements (1-5, 7, 9, 10, 12), arrangements (3, 7, 9, 10), percussion (5), bass guitar (7), horn arrangements (9)
 David Benoit – synthesizers (1, 8, 10), organ (1), keyboards (3, 4, 7, 9), arrangements (3, 7, 9), string arrangements (4), Yamaha DX7 (6, 13), keyboard arrangements (6), horn arrangements (9), synth horns (9), synth strings (9, 11, 12), acoustic piano (10, 11)
 Greg Phillinganes – synth horns (1), synth bass (1, 9), horn arrangements (1), vocal arrangements (9)
 Bruce Hornsby – accordion (5)
 Richard Tee – acoustic piano (8, 12), Yamaha DX7 (12)
 David Pack – guitar (1, 7), arrangements (1, 3, 4, 5, 7, 8, 9), horn arrangements (1, 5, 9), electronic congas (3), vocal arrangements (4, 5, 7, 8, 9, 12), lead vocals (4), backing vocals (4, 5, 8, 12), acoustic guitar (5), baritone guitar (5), percussion (5), electronic  percussion (7)
 David Lindley – lap steel guitar (5), slide guitar (5)
 Earl Klugh – classical guitar (7), guitar (10)
 Nathan East – bass guitar (3)
 Roscoe Beck – electric upright bass (4), bass guitar (8)
 Chuck Domanico – bass guitar (10, 11)
 Joe Puerta – bass guitar (12)
 Vinnie Colaiuta – drums (1)
 George Perilli – drums (3, 9), percussion (4)
 Jeff Porcaro – drums (4, 7)
 John Robinson – drums (8, 12)
 Paulinho da Costa – percussion (3, 5, 7)
 Burleigh Drummond – percussion (5)
 Dan Higgins – saxophone (1, 9), woodwinds (1, 9)
 Ernie Watts – saxophone solo (3, 8)
 Michael Brecker – saxophone solo (4)
 Greg Huckins – saxophone (10)
 Bill Reichenbach Jr. – trombone (1, 9)
 Bill Watrous – trombone (10)
 Gary Grant – trumpet (1, 9)
 Jerry Hey – trumpet (1, 9), horn arrangements (1, 9)
 Jon Faddis – flugelhorn solo (7), trumpet solo (11)
 John Rotella – clarinet (10)
 Red Callender – tuba (10)
 Marty Paich – string arrangements and conductor (6, 11, 13)
 Jimmie Haskell – horn arrangements and conductor (10)
 Jimmy Webb – arrangements (12)
 James Ingram – backing vocals (5, 8, 12), vocal arrangements (8)
 Michael McDonald – backing vocals (5, 8, 12), vocal arrangements (8), acoustic piano (8)
 Howard Hewett – backing vocals (12)
 Amy Holland – backing vocals (12)
 Luther Vandross – backing vocals (12)
 Tata Vega – backing vocals (12)Strings (4, 6, 11, 13)'
 Arnold Belnick
 Chuck Berghofer
 Jackie Brand
 Franklyn D'Antonio
 Alan DeVeritch
 Bonnie Douglas 
 Arni Egilsson
 Richard Elegino
 Steve Erdody
 Henry Ferber
 James Getzoff
 Barry Gold
 Harris Goldman
 Nathan Kaproff
 Ray Kelley
 Gayle Levant 
 Joy Lyle
 Michael Markman
 Donald McInnes
 Cynthia Morrow
 Dan Neufeld
 Nils Oliver
 Daniel Rothmuller
 Art Royval
 Sid Sharp 
 Harry Shlutz
 Henry Shure
 Vicky Sylvester 
 Charles Veal
 Evan Wilson 
 Herschel Wise

Production 
 Producer – David Pack
 Executive and Associate Producer – Patti Austin
 Engineers – Ben Rodgers (Tracks 1-10, 12 & 13); Mark Linett (Tracks 7 & 9); James Guthrie (Track 11).
 Additional Recording – Ben Rodgers (Tracks 7, 9, 11 & 13); Mark Linett (Track 10); James Farber (Tracks 11 & 12).
 Mixing – Ross Pallone (Tracks 1, 3 & 5); Ben Rodgers (Tracks 1-10, 12 & 13); Rik Pekkonen (Tracks 7, 10 & 12).
 Recorded and Mixed at Pack's Place (Sunland, CA).
 Additional recording at Atlantic Studios and The Hit Factory (New York, NY).
 Strings recorded by Allen Sides at Ocean Way Recording (Hollywood, CA).
 Art Direction and Design – Mary Ann Dibs
 Photography – Mark Raboy

Charts

References

External links
The Real Me at Discogs
The Real Me at All Music
Patti Austin's Official Site

1988 albums
Patti Austin albums
Qwest Records albums